Hubertus Castle is a 1934 German drama film directed by Hans Deppe and starring Friedrich Ulmer, Hansi Knoteck and Arthur Schröder. It is an adaptation of the 1895 novel of the same title by Ludwig Ganghofer.

The film's sets were designed by the art director Carl Ludwig Kirmse. Location filming took place in Carinthia in Austria and in Bavaria. It was popular enough to be re-released in 1950.

Cast
 Friedrich Ulmer as Graf Egge
  Hansi Knoteck as Kitty, seine Tochter
  Arthur Schröder as Tassilo, sein Sohn
  Margarete Parbs as Frl. v. Kleesberg
  Hans Schlenck as  Werner Forbeck, ein Maler
  Paul Richter as Franz, Jäger
  Hans Adalbert Schlettow as Schipper, Jäger
 Viktor Gehring as Bruckner
 Grete Roman as Anna Herwegh
 Herta Worell as Mali

See also
Hubertus Castle 1954 film
Hubertus Castle 1973 film

References

Bibliography

External links

1934 films
Films of Nazi Germany
1934 drama films
1930s German-language films
Films based on works by Ludwig Ganghofer
Films based on German novels
Films directed by Hans Deppe
Films set in Bavaria
Films set in the Alps
Films set in castles
Films about hunters
German black-and-white films
UFA GmbH films
German drama films
1930s German films